Stupnica is a right tributary of the San River in southeastern Poland. Its length is roughly 28 kilometres. It joins the San near Bachów.

References 

Rivers of Poland
Rivers of Podkarpackie Voivodeship